William John "Pete" Knight (November 18, 1929 – May 7, 2004) (Col, USAF) was an American aeronautical engineer, politician, Vietnam War combat pilot, test pilot, and astronaut.  He was one of twelve pilots who flew the North American X-15, an experimental spaceplane jointly operated by the U.S. Air Force and NASA.  He was also selected for participation in the X-20 Dyna-Soar program.

On October 3, 1967, Knight piloted X-15 Flight 188, the program's fastest flight.  Flying at a maximum Mach of 6.7 and a maximum speed of 4,520 mph (7,274 km/h), he set a speed record for flight in a winged, powered aircraft.  The flight was made in the X-15A-2, the second of three planes in the X-15 fleet.

Two weeks later on October 17, Knight flew X-15 Flight 190, reaching a maximum altitude above 50 miles.  This qualified him as an astronaut according to the United States definition of the boundary of space.  However, this altitude did not surpass the Kármán line, the internationally accepted boundary of 100 kilometers (62 miles).  It was the last successful flight of the X-15-3, the fleet's third plane.  On November 15, X-15 Flight 191 ended in disaster, killing pilot Michael Adams and destroying the X-15-3.

Early life and education
Knight was born November 18, 1929, in Noblesville, Indiana, to parents William T. Knight (1906–1968) and Mary Emma Knight (1909–1959). Following high school, Knight attended Butler University and Purdue University. He graduated with a Bachelor of Science degree in Aeronautical Engineering from the U.S. Air Force Institute of Technology in 1958.

Personal
Knight was married to Helena Stone and they had three sons, Steve, Peter, and David. Helena predeceased Knight. Knight remarried and at his death in 2004 he was survived by his widow Gail, a brother, three sons, four stepchildren and 15 grandchildren.

Air Force career
Knight joined the United States Air Force in 1951. While only a second lieutenant, he flew an F-89 at the National Air Show in 1954 and won the Allison Jet Trophy.

Starting in 1958, following his graduation from both U.S. Air Force Institute of Technology and the Air Force Experimental Flight Test Pilot School (Class 58C), Knight served as a test pilot at Edwards Air Force Base, California. He was a project test pilot for the F-100 Super Sabre, F-101 Voodoo, F-104 Starfighter and later, T-38 Talon and F-5 Freedom Fighter test programs. In 1960, he was one of six test pilots selected to fly the X-20 Dyna-Soar, which was slated to become the first winged orbital space vehicle capable of lifting reentries and conventional landings. After the X-20 program was canceled in 1963, he completed the astronaut training curriculum through the Aerospace Research Pilot School (Class 63A) at Edwards AFB and was selected to fly the North American X-15.

He had more than his share of eventful flights in the X-15. While climbing through  at Mach 4.17 on June 29, 1967, he suffered a total electrical failure and all onboard systems shut down. For his remarkable feat of airmanship that day, he earned a Distinguished Flying Cross.

After nearly ten years of test flying at Edwards AFB, he went to Southeast Asia in 1968, where he completed a total of 253 combat missions in the F-100 during the Vietnam War. Following his combat tour, he served as test director during development of the F-15 Eagle at Wright Patterson Air Force Base in Dayton, Ohio. He also was the program director for the International Fighter (F-5) Program at Wright-Patterson. In 1979, he returned to Edwards AFB, and served as a test pilot for the F-16 Fighting Falcon.

After 32 years of service and more than 6,000 hours in the cockpits of more than 100 different aircraft, he retired from the U.S. Air Force as a colonel in 1982.

Political career
In 1984, he was elected to the city council of Palmdale, California, and four years later became the city's first elected mayor.  In 1992, he was elected to serve in the California State Assembly representing the 36th District. He served in the State Senate representing the 17th District from 1996 until his death on May 7, 2004. Knight's youngest son, Steve Knight served as assemblyman for the 36th Assembly District from 2008 to 2012, the seat previously held by his father.

Proposition 22

During his term in the Senate, Knight gained statewide attention in 2000 as the author of Proposition 22, a.k.a. the "Knight Initiative", the purpose of which was to ban same-sex marriage: "Only marriage between a man and a woman is valid or recognized in California." The proposition passed with 61.4% approval and 38.6% against. On March 9, 2004, Knight's son, David Knight, who is gay, married his partner during the period when San Francisco performed same-sex marriages in defiance of state law. These marriages were later nullified by the California Supreme Court in 2004. The Court later found Proposition 22 to be unconstitutional in In re Marriage Cases (2008).

In addition to his gay son, Knight also had a younger brother who died of AIDS-related complications in 1995 at age 60. Of his younger brother, Knight would only say, "We never talked about it."

Watch
 Pete Knight's Final Television Interview (30 min., free, taped 4-1-2004)

Awards and honors
 Legion of Merit
 Distinguished Flying Cross
 Air Medal
 Harmon Trophy, 1967
 AIAA Octave Chanute Award, 1968
 Enshrined in the National Aviation Hall of Fame in 1988.
 Inducted into the Aerospace Walk of Honor in 1990.
 Inducted into the International Space Hall of Fame in 1998.

In the city of Palmdale, Pete Knight High School was opened in his memory. The school began its first year in the school year of 2003–2004 and celebrated its first graduating class in 2007.

References

Bibliography
 Thompson, Milton O. (1992) At The Edge Of Space: The X-15 Flight Program, Smithsonian Institution Press, Washington and London.

External links

 Knight's official NASA biography
 Astronautix biography of Pete Knight
 Spacefacts biography of Pete Knight
 Pete Knight  at the National Aviation Hall of Fame
 Knight at International Space Hall of Fame
 
 Join California William J. Knight

1929 births
2004 deaths
20th-century American engineers
20th-century American politicians
21st-century American politicians
Air Force Institute of Technology alumni
American aerospace engineers
American astronaut-politicians
United States Air Force personnel of the Vietnam War
American test pilots
California city council members
Republican Party California state senators
Deaths from leukemia
Engineers from California
Harmon Trophy winners
Republican Party members of the California State Assembly
People from Noblesville, Indiana
People from Palmdale, California
Recipients of the Distinguished Flying Cross (United States)
U.S. Air Force Test Pilot School alumni
United States Air Force astronauts
United States Air Force colonels
X-15 program
People who have flown in suborbital spaceflight
Military personnel from California